Psi Crateris, Latinized from ψ Crateris, is the Bayer designation for a visual binary star system in the southern constellation of Crater. It is faintly visible to the naked eye with an apparent visual magnitude of 6.13. According to the Bortle scale, it requires dark suburban or rural skies to view. Based upon an annual parallax shift of 6.5 mas, the system is located approximately 500 light years away from the Sun.

The components in this star system have an orbital period of about 366 years with an eccentricity of 0.43. The angular size of the orbit's semimajor axis is about half an arc second. The primary member, component A, is an ordinary A-type main sequence star with a visual magnitude of 6.24 and a stellar classification of A0 V. It was a candidate λ Boötis star, but this was later rejected when the spectrum was found to be normal. Any peculiarities may have instead resulted from the overlapping spectra of the two stars. The star is radiating about 75 times the solar luminosity from it outer atmosphere at an effective temperature of 9,199 K. The fainter secondary, component B, has a visual magnitude of 8.34 and a class of A3.

References

A-type main-sequence stars
Spectroscopic binaries
Crater (constellation)
Crateris, Psi
Durchmusterung objects
097411
054742
4347